Lutheran Service Book (LSB) is the newest official hymnal of the Lutheran Church–Missouri Synod (LCMS) and the Lutheran Church–Canada (LCC). It was prepared by the LCMS Commission on Worship and published by Concordia Publishing House, the official publisher of the LCMS. It is the fourth official English-language hymnal of the LCMS published since the synod began transitioning from German to English in the early 1900s. LSB is intended to succeed both The Lutheran Hymnal (TLH) and Lutheran Worship (LW) as the common hymnal of the LCMS. Supplemental and companion editions to the hymnal were released throughout the end of 2006 and into 2007. The hymnal was officially approved by the LCMS at the 2004 LCMS National Convention in St. Louis. It was officially released on September 1, 2006, but many customers who pre-ordered the hymnal received their copies several weeks earlier.

In April 2015, Lutheran Service Book became the first Lutheran hymnal to be made available in ebook format.

Contents

A selection of Psalms
Five musical settings of the Divine Service
Setting One (by Richard Hillert, first introduced in Lutheran Book of Worship)
Setting Two (by Ronald A. Nelson, first introduced in Lutheran Book of Worship)
Setting Three (the Common Service of 1888)
Setting Four (first introduced in Hymnal Supplement 98)
Setting Five (based loosely on the Deutsche Messe by Martin Luther)
Musical settings of the Daily Offices
Matins
Vespers
Morning Prayer
Evening Prayer
Compline
Other orders of service
Service of Prayer and Preaching
Holy Baptism
Confirmation
Holy Matrimony
Funeral Service
Two orders for responsive prayer
Responsive Prayer 1 (Suffrages)
Responsive Prayer 2
The Litany
Corporate Confession and Absolution
Individual Confession and Absolution
Daily Prayer for Individuals and Families
Daily Lectionary
More than 100 prayers for various occasions and circumstances
Martin Luther's Small Catechism
658 canticles, chorales, hymns, and songs, 23 of which are found in Lutheran Service Builder (see below)
Comprehensive cross-referenced indexes

Editions

In addition to the pew edition, several other editions of LSB are available:

Altar Book
Accompaniment editions
LSB Accompaniment—Liturgy
LSB Accompaniment—Hymns
Guitar Edition
Ebook Edition
Lectionaries
Three-Year Lectionary—Year A
Three-Year Lectionary—Year B
Three-Year Lectionary—Year C
One-Year Lectionary
Agenda
Pastoral Care Companion

See also
List of English-language hymnals by denomination

Lutheran Service Builder
In addition to the various print editions of the hymnal, the Commission on Worship prepared an electronic edition of Lutheran Service Book known as Lutheran Service Builder. This computer program is structured in order to allow churches to easily prepare printed orders of service and electronically presented orders of service, containing readings, hymns, and service music.

References

External links
Official site
Official site for ebook edition
Database of Lutheran Hymns, shows which hymn is in which hymnal

Lutheran hymnals
Lutheran Church–Missouri Synod
2006 non-fiction books
21st-century Christian texts
2006 in music
2006 in Christianity